Walter Scarle (died c. 1401), of Uppingham, Rutland, was an English politician.

Family
He married a woman named Margaret, whose maiden name is unrecorded. They had one son, Robert Scarle, who was MP for Rutland himself in 1406. Scarle is likely to have been related to Lord High Chancellor of England, John Scarle.

Career
He was a Member (MP) of the Parliament of England for Rutland in 1368, 1378, January 1380, 1386, September 1388, 1393 and 1395.

References

14th-century births
1401 deaths
English MPs 1368
People from Uppingham
English MPs 1378
English MPs January 1380
English MPs 1386
English MPs September 1388
English MPs 1393
English MPs 1395